Anthology is a compilation of rare demos and live recordings by House of Lords, released on October 14, 2008.

The album was mixed and produced by the band's original drummer Ken Mary.

Track listing
 "I Wanna Be Loved" - 3:33
 "Can't Find My Way Home" (Blind Faith cover) - 4:55 
 "Dangerous Woman" - 4:02
 "Hold Back the Night" - 4:23
 "Chains of Love" 3:43
 "The Legend Lives On" - 4:19
 "Sahara" - 5:26
 "Hero's Song" - 4:57
 "Kiss of Fire" - 2:43
 "Bad Bones" - 4:24
 "Beyond the Pale" - 3:53
 "Lookin' for Strange" (Live 1989) - 4:51
 "Edge of Your Life" (Live 1989) - 5:02
 "Lanny's Solo" (Live 1989) - 2:32
 "Under Blue Skies" (Live 1989) - 4:30
 "American Babylon" (Live Experimental 1994) - 3:56

External links
[ Billboard.com]

2008 compilation albums
House of Lords (band) albums
Cleopatra Records compilation albums